Sweet 'N' Sassy is a 1964 studio album by Sarah Vaughan, arranged by Lalo Schifrin.

Reception

The Allmusic review by Ronnie D. Lankford, Jr awarded the album three stars and said that "Surrounded by strings and syrupy arrangements, Vaughan brings her lovely voice to bear on a dozen standards...The album serves as the perfect late-evening album...Vaughan delivers an ethereal and relaxed collection that will please fans".

Track listing
 "I Didn't Know About You" (Duke Ellington, Bob Russell) - 3:46
 "More Than You Know" (Edward Eliscu, Billy Rose, Vincent Youmans) - 3:38
 "Thanks for the Ride" (Roy Alfred, Betty Ford) - 3:14
 "Come Spring" (A. Miller, P. Stevens) - 2:23
 "I Wish I Were in Love Again" (Lorenz Hart, Richard Rodgers) - 2:27
 "Lazy Afternoon" (John La Touche, Jerome Moross) - 2:54
 "Just Married Today" (Alfred, Al Frisch) - 4:25
 "Something I Dreamed Last Night" (Sammy Fain, Herb Magidson, Jack Yellen) - 4:45
 "I Got Rhythm" (George Gershwin, Ira Gershwin) - 1:54
 "This Can't Be Love" (Hart, Rodgers) - 1:39
 "Slowly" (Kermit Goell, David Raksin) - 3:34
 "Just You, Just Me" (Jesse Greer, Raymond Klages) - 2:12
 "This Can't Be Love" (Hart, Rodgers) - 1:35

Personnel
Sarah Vaughan - vocals
Lalo Schifrin - arranger, conductor

References

Roulette Records albums
Albums conducted by Lalo Schifrin
Albums arranged by Lalo Schifrin
Albums produced by Teddy Reig
Sarah Vaughan albums
1963 albums